MV Vinalines Queen was a bulk carrier of the Vietnam National Shipping Lines, or Vinalines. On its last voyage the ship was travelling from Indonesia to China with more than 54,000 tonnes of nickel ore. The ship disappeared on 25 December 2011 and its fate was initially unknown. On 30 December 2011 a single survivor of its 23-member crew, Dau Ngoc Hung, was found by the British ship London Courage, after floating with a rescue vest for 5 days. He reported that the ship sank quickly in the early hours of the morning after capsizing to the left.

It is thought that the probable cause of sinking was liquefaction of her nickel ore cargo resulting in the shifting of cargo in the holds, which destabilised the vessel causing her to sink.

References

Bulk carriers
Maritime incidents in 2011
2005 ships
December 2011 events in Asia